Alan Spencer Edwards (birth unknown – death unknown) was a Welsh rugby union, and professional rugby league footballer who played in the 1930s and 1940s. He played club level rugby union (RU) for Aberavon RFC, the Royal Air Force, and representative level rugby league (RL) for Great Britain and Wales, and at club level for Salford, Leeds (World War II guest), Dewsbury (World War II guest), and Bradford Northern (two spells, including the first as a World War II guest), as a

Background
Alan Edwards was born in Kenfig Hill, Bridgend.

Playing career

International honours
Alan Edwards won 18 caps for Wales (RL) in 1935–1948 while at Salford and Bradford Northern, and won caps for Great Britain (RL) while at Salford in 1936 against Australia (3 matches), and New Zealand (2 matches); and in 1937 against Australia (2 matches). He was the youngest member of the 1936 tour party

Championship final appearances
Alan Edwards played  in Salford's Championship winning teams of 1937 and 1939. They beat Warrington 13-11 in 1937 and Edwards scored the winning try in 1939 when Salford beat Castleford 8-6 at Maine Road Manchester. He played in Dewsbury's 14-25 aggregate defeat by Wigan in the War-time emergency play-off Final during the 1943–44 season; the 9-13 first-leg defeat at Central Park, Wigan on Saturday 13 May 1944, and the 5-12-second-leg defeat at Crown Flatt, Dewsbury on Saturday 20 May 1944. The year after he played for Bradford Northern when they beat Halifax 26-20 on aggregate to win the last war-time emergency play-off. He played in his last Championship Final in 1948 when he was in the Bradford Northern team that lost 15-5 to Warrington at Maine Road, Manchester.

County League appearances
Alan Edwards played in Salford's victories in the Lancashire County League during the 1936–37 season and 1938–39 season, and played in Bradford Northern's victory in the Yorkshire County League during the 1947–48 season.

Challenge Cup Final appearances
Alan Edwards played  in Salford's 7-4 victory over Barrow in the 1937–38 Challenge Cup Final during the 1937–38 season at Wembley Stadium, London, on Saturday 7 May 1938, in front of a crowd of 51,243, played  in the 3-20 defeat by Halifax in the 1937–38 Challenge Cup Final during the 1938–39 season at Wembley Stadium, London, on Saturday 6 May 1939, in front of a crowd of 55,453, played  in Leeds' 15-10 victory over Halifax in the 1941–42 Challenge Cup Final during the 1941–42 season at Odsal Stadium, Bradford, in front of a crowd of 15,250. played in Dewsbury's 16-15 aggregate victory over Leeds in the 1942–43 Challenge Cup Final during the 1942–43 season; the 16-9 first-leg victory at Crown Flatt, Dewsbury on Sunday 9 May 1943, in front of a crowd of 10,470, and the 0-6 second-leg defeat at Headingley Rugby Stadium, Leeds on Sunday 16 May 1943, in front of a crowd of 16,000, played right- in Bradford Northern's 9-13 aggregate defeat by Huddersfield in the 1944–45 Challenge Cup Final during the 1944–45 season; the 4-7 defeat at Fartown Ground, Huddersfield on Saturday 28 April 1945, in front of a crowd of 9,041, and the 5-6 defeat at Odsal Stadium, Bradford on Saturday 5 May 1945 (three days before Victory in Europe Day), in front of a crowd of 17,500, played , and scored a try in the 8-3 defeat by Wigan in the 1947–48 Challenge Cup Final during the 1947–48 season at Wembley Stadium, London on Saturday 1 May 1948, in front of a crowd of 91,465, and played  in his last final in the 12-0 victory over Halifax in the 1948–49 Challenge Cup Final during the 1948–49 season at Wembley Stadium, London on Saturday 7 May 1949, in front of a crowd of 95,050. He played in a total of seven Rugby League Challenge Cup Finals which was a record at that time he shared with Eric Batten. He was the first man to play for four different teams in the Challenge Cup Final and the only man to win the Challenge Cup with four different teams.

County Cup Final appearances
About Alan Edwards' time, there was Salford's 2-15 defeat by Warrington in the 1929–30 Lancashire County Cup Final during the 1929–30 season at Central Park, Wigan on Saturday 23 November 1929, the 10-8 victory over Swinton in the 1931–32 Lancashire County Cup Final during the 1931–32 season at The Cliff, Broughton, Salford on Saturday 21 November 1931, the 21-12 victory over Wigan in the 1934–35 Lancashire County Cup Final during the 1934–35 season at Station Road, Swinton on Saturday 20 October 1934, the 15-7 victory over Wigan in the 1935 Lancashire County Cup Final during the 1935–36 season at Wilderspool Stadium, Warrington on Saturday 19 October 1935, the 5-2 victory over Wigan in the 1936–37 Lancashire County Cup Final during the 1936–37 season at Wilderspool Stadium, Warrington on Saturday 17 October 1936, he played  in the 7-10 defeat by Wigan in the 1938–39 Lancashire County Cup Final during the 1938–39 season at Station Road, Swinton on Saturday 22 October 1938. and played  and scored 2-tries, and 3-goals in Bradford Northern's 18-9 victory over Castleford in the 1948–49 Yorkshire County Cup Final during the 1948–49 season at Headingley Rugby Stadium, Leeds on Saturday 30 October 1948.

Other notable matches
Alan Edwards played  for a Rugby League XIII against Northern Command XIII at Thrum Hall, Halifax on Saturday 21 March 1942.

All Six Cups
Only five rugby league footballers have won "All Six Cups" during their career, they are; Aubrey Casewell (while at Salford and Leeds), Alan Edwards (while at Salford and Bradford Northern), John Etty (while at Oldham and Wakefield Trinity), Edward "Ted" Slevin (while at Wigan and Huddersfield), and Derek Turner (while at Oldham and Wakefield Trinity). "All Six Cups" being the Challenge Cup, Championship, Lancashire County Cup, Lancashire County League, Yorkshire County Cup and Yorkshire County League.

Career records
Alan Edwards is one of less than twenty-five Welshmen to have scored more than 1000-points in their rugby league career.

Personal life
Edwards' marriage to Jessie (née Burgess) was registered on 28 December 1941 in Salford district. They had two children, Alan Blair Edwards (birth registered during second ¼  in Salford district), and Marvyn A. Edwards (birth registered during third ¼  in Salford district). In 1973, Alan and Jessie emigrated to Hamilton, Ontario, Canada.

References

External links
!Great Britain Statistics at englandrl.co.uk (statistics currently missing due to not having appeared for both Great Britain, and England)
Photograph "1947 Welsh team - The Welsh team pictured in Bordeaux prior to their game v France in 1947 - Date: 01/01/1947 - Players: N/A, Price, N/A, Frank Whitcombe, Ted Ward, Mel Meake, N/A, Trevor Foster, Alan Edwards, Dai Jenkins, N/A, N/A, Roy Francis" at rlhp.co.uk
Photograph "1948 Challenge Cup Final - A world record crowd of 91,465 saw Bradford Northern lose to Wigan by 8 points to 3 in this 1948 Final at Wembley. Here King George VI is seen being introduced to the Bradford Northern side. - Date: 01/05/1948" at rlhp.co.uk
(archived by web.archive.org) "40503 - The RAF team who, on 16th January 1943, beat South Wales – at the third attempt – at Swansea. 16 April(sic?) 1943" 

Aberavon RFC players
Bradford Bulls players
Dewsbury Rams players
Footballers who switched code
Great Britain national rugby league team players
Place of death missing
Royal Air Force personnel of World War II
Royal Air Force rugby union players
Rugby league players from Bridgend County Borough
Rugby league wingers
Rugby League XIII players
Rugby union players from Kenfig Hill
Salford Red Devils players
Wales national rugby league team players
Welsh rugby league players
Welsh rugby union players
Year of birth missing
Year of death missing